Mülheim – Essen I is an electoral constituency (German: Wahlkreis) represented in the Bundestag. It elects one member via first-past-the-post voting. Under the current constituency numbering system, it is designated as constituency 118. It is located in the Ruhr region of North Rhine-Westphalia, comprising the city of Mülheim and northwestern parts of the city of Essen.

Mülheim – Essen I was created for the inaugural 1949 federal election. Since 2021, it has been represented by Sebastian Fiedler of the Social Democratic Party (SPD).

Geography
Mülheim – Essen I is located in the Ruhr region of North Rhine-Westphalia. As of the 2021 federal election, it comprises the independent city of Mülheim and the Stadtbezirk IV (Borbeck) from the independent city of Essen.

History
Mülheim – Essen I was created in 1949, then known as Mülheim. It acquired its current name in the 2002 election. In the 1949 election, it was North Rhine-Westphalia constituency 29 in the numbering system. From 1953 through 1961, it was number 88. From 1965 through 1976, it was number 86. From 1980 through 1998, it was number 87. From 2002 through 2009, it was number 119. Since 2013, it has been number 118.

Originally, the constituency comprised only the city of Mülheim. In the 2002 election, it acquired Stadtbezirk IV (Borbeck) from the city of Essen.

Members
The constituency has been held by the Social Democratic Party (SPD) during all but two Bundestag terms since 1949. It was first represented by Otto Striebeck of the SPD from 1949 to 1953, followed by Gisela Praetorius of the Christian Democratic Union (CDU) for a single term. Fellow CDU member Max Vehar then served from 1957 to 1961, before former member Striebeck regained the constituency for the SPD. Willi Müller of the SPD was representative from 1965 to 1980, when he was succeeded by Thomas Schröer. Dieter Schloten served from 1990 to 2002, followed by Anton Schaaf until 2013. Arno Klare was elected in 2013 and re-elected in 2017. He was succeeded by Sebastian Fiedler in 2021.

Election results

2021 election

2017 election

2013 election

2009 election

References

Federal electoral districts in North Rhine-Westphalia
1949 establishments in West Germany
Constituencies established in 1949
Mülheim
Essen